Castillejos, officially the Municipality of Castillejos, is a 3rd class municipality in the province of Zambales, Philippines. According to the 2020 census, it has a population of 67,889 people.

The municipality is located between San Antonio, Subic and San Marcelino.

A strong magnitude 6.1 earthquake occurred on 5:11pm (UTC+08:00), April 22, 2019, according to PHIVOLCS.

Geography

Barangays
Castillejos is politically subdivided into 14 barangays.

 Balaybay
 Buenavista
 Del Pilar
 Looc
 Magsaysay
 Nagbayan
 Nagbunga
 San Agustin
 San Jose (Poblacion)
 San Juan (Poblacion)
 San Nicolas
 San Pablo (Poblacion)
 San Roque
 Santa Maria

Climate

Demographics

Economy

Education

Elementary schools
 Precious Child Montessori of Zambales, Inc.
 San Isidro Elementary School
 Aldersgate Learning Center
 Hanniel Christian Academy
 Castillejos Elementary School
 Pres.Ramon F. Magsaysay Elementary School
 San Agustin Elementary School
 Santa Maria Elementary School
 Magsaysay Elementary School
 Del Pilar Elementary School
 Balaybay Elementary School
 Villaflor Elementary School
 Looc Elementary School
 Nagbayan Elementary School
 Hanjin Integrated School

High schools
 Precious Heritage of Zambales, Inc.
 St. Nicholas Academy
 Castillejos National High School
 San Agustin High School
 Castillejos Resettlement High School (formerly Jesus F. Magsaysay High School Annex)
 Jesus F. Magsaysay Tech. Voc. High School
 Hanjin Integrated School

College/University:
 President Ramon Magsaysay State University, College of Governance

References

External links

Castillejos Profile at PhilAtlas.com
[ Philippine Standard Geographic Code]
Philippine Census Information

Municipalities of Zambales